The Editions Victor Gadoury is a Monaco publishing company specialized in numismatics and selling coin catalogs.

History
The Editions Victor Gadoury was founded in Baden-Baden in 1972. Victor Gadoury was a member of a division within the Canadian Army that was stationed in Germany. After his discharge he decided to remain in Germany and become a numismatic.

In 1973 Victor Gadoury founded the publishing house Editions Victor Gadoury where he published the first edition of Monnaies Françaises in 1973, gathering knowledge on all French coins from 1789 until the present. Since then, the book has been published every two years; Monnaies Françaises 2009 was its 19th edition.

In 1978 Victor Gadoury moved his publishing house Editions Victor Gadoury to the Principality of Monaco, at the end of the Boulevard d'Italie, moving next to the Boulevard de Moulins before returning to the Boulevard d'Italie.

In 1994, the publishing house Editions Victor Gadoury was acquired by two Italian numismatics, Vescovi and Pastrone, and since November 2001 Editions Victor Gadoury has been managed solely by Francesco Pastrone in Monaco.

External links
Official Website

Publishing companies of Monaco
Companies based in Monte Carlo
Coins
Numismatics